Jiao Yulu (16 August 1922 – 14 May 1964) was a Chinese politician. Jiao Yulu was a symbol of the honest Party cadre who devotes himself tirelessly to the Communist State. Jiao Yulu was considered to be a glorious example - Mao Zedong's good student during the period of Mao's personality cult. After his death, a campaign to study Jiao Yulu's example was started in 1966. The aim of the campaign was to boost morale and to rally the people to work harder to overcome difficulties. Party members in particular were called upon to follow Jiao Yulu's example by conducting more research and investigations into local conditions, and learn from his leadership style.

Life and career
Jiao Yulu was born in Yuanquan Town of Boshan District, in Zibo city, in Shandong province, to a poor family, on August 16, 1922, during the Republic of China. Both his father Jiao Fangtian and mother were farmers. He had only four years of schooling. His father hanged himself during the Second Sino-Japanese War. Jiao Yulu was conscripted into the Japanese labor and he was sent to coal-mining in Fushun, Liaoning, Manchoukuo. He escaped to Suqian, Jiangsu in the fall of 1943. He had been a farm labourer for two years for the landowner Hu Tairong.

In 1945, after the defeat of the Japanese in the Second World War, he returned his hometown and joined a militia. He once took part in the battle of liberating Boshan District. Jiao Yulu joined the Communist Party of China in January 1946, and he soon was transferred to Bohai, Shandong and appointed a group leader of the Land Reform movement. By late Chinese Civil War, he worked in Weishi County, Henan province until 1951. In June 1953, he was transferred to Luoyang Mine Machine Manufacturing Plant and worked there until 1962.

In June 1962, he was appointed Communist Party Secretary of Weishi County. In December, he became the Second Communist Party Secretary of Lankao County. This region had declined into poverty and ignorance. The county had long been plagued by dust storms, waterlogging, and alkaline lands. Jiao Yulu devoted his energies to fight economic backwardness. He mobilized the local residents to contend with the poor natural conditions. Due to years of toil, Jiao Yulu broke down from constant overwork and he was diagnosed with liver cancer. But he continued his struggle against natural disasters. On May 14, 1964, he died of liver cancer, aged 42.

On February 1, 1966, Henan Provincial People's Government awarded him the title of "Revolutionary Martyr".

In 2009, Jiao Yulu was listed as one of the "One Hundred Moving China Character Since 1949".

Personal life
Jiao Yulu married Xu Junya (1932-2005;, a female politician from Weishi County, Henan province. They had three sons and three daughters.

 Sons: Jiao Guoqing, Jiao Yuejin, Jiao Baogang
 Daughters: Jiao Shoufeng, Jiao Shouyun, Jiao Shoujun

References

Further reading
 
 
 

1922 births
1964 deaths
Politicians from Zibo
People's Republic of China politicians from Shandong
Chinese Communist Party politicians from Shandong